The Obersee (German for "Upper Lake"), also known as Upper Lake Constance, is the much larger of the two parts of Lake Constance, the other part being the Untersee ("Lower Lake").

Geography 

The Obersee has an area of 473 km² in size and extends for 63 km between Bregenz and Bodman-Ludwigshafen. Its maximum width is 14 km. It drains through the Seerhein in Constance into the Untersee. Its main inflow is the Alpine Rhine.

The distinctive, northwestern arm and -large Lake Überlingen (Standard German of Germany: Überlinger See) is part of the Upper Lake Constance, as well as the Bay of Bregenz, and the Constance Hopper.

The countries that border the lake are Switzerland, with its cantons of Thurgau and St. Gallen, Austria, with its federal state Vorarlberg, and Germany, with its federal states of Baden-Württemberg and Bavaria. 
The border between the riparian states on the south-eastern main part of the Obersee have never been jointly agreed (see Lake Constance); only the smaller northwestern water of Lake Überlingen is completely German territory.

Origin of the name 
The Romans called it Lacus Venetus, Lacus Brigantinus and Lacus Constantinus. In the Middle Ages the dominant term was Lacus Bodamicus, or in German Bodensee. Gradually, this name began to include the Lower Lake (Lacus Acronius), so the term "Upper Lake" was introduced for the larger lake.

See also
Untersee (Lake Constance)

References

External links 
 International Bodensee Conference
 Bodensee-data of the International Lake Constance Conference

LObersee
Geography of Lake Constance
Lakes of Baden-Württemberg
Lakes of Vorarlberg
Lakes of the canton of St. Gallen
Lakes of Thurgau
Konstanz (district)
Bodenseekreis
Lindau (district)